James Edward "Doc" Counsilman (December 28, 1920 – January 4, 2004) was an Olympic and hall-of-fame swimming coach from the United States. He was the head swimming coach at Indiana University (IU) from 1957 to 1990. He served as head coach for the USA's Olympic swim teams for 1964 and 1976; and was inducted as an Honors Coach into the International Swimming Hall of Fame in 1976.

Early career
Counsilman was born in Birmingham, Alabama, but grew up and learned to swim in St. Louis, Missouri. He swam collegiately for Ohio State University under coach Mike Peppe, and while in college set world-records in the 50 and 300 yard breaststrokes. During World War II, Counsilman served in the United States Army Air Forces in Italy as a B-24 Liberator pilot with the 455th Bomb Group of the Fifteenth Air Force.

Post Ohio State, Counsilman went on to earn a master's degree at the University of Illinois (1947), where he also served as an assistant coach, before pursuing a doctorate degree in physiology from the University of Iowa where he was also the assistant coach under David Armbruster(1948-1951). It was at the Iowa that Counsilman coached his first two Olympians-Wally Ris and Bowen Stassforth. Following award of his doctorate, the now-dubbed "Doc" began teaching and coaching at Cortland State University, where he stayed from 1952 to 1957, before beginning his career at Indiana University.

While at Cortland State, he coached freshman George Breen in 1953. Breen was molded by Counsilman into a standout athlete, and broke the world record for the 1500 meter freestyle. Breen, qualifying for the 1956 Olympic Games in Melbourne, set another world record in the 1500 meter freestyle with a time of 17:52.9 during the preliminaries, but was unable to match the time in the finals and received only a Bronze medal.

Once at Indiana University, he continued to train Breen for the 1500, an event for which he would receive a second bronze medal in the 1960 Olympics in Rome. Ultimately, Counsilman was credited with molding Breen into one of the finest Olympic distance swimmers in United States history.

Tenure at IU (1957–1990)
At IU, Counsilman coached the men's team to 6 consecutive NCAA Men's Swimming and Diving Championships (1968–1973), and 20 consecutive (1961–1980) and 23 total Big Ten Conference titles. While at IU, Doc coached over 60 Olympic swimmers, including Mark Spitz.

He served as the Men's Head Coach of the USA's swimming team at the 1964 Olympics (where the USA men won 9-of-11 events) and at 1976 Olympics (USA men won 12-of-13 events).

In 1961, he was named Coach of the Year by the American Swimming Coaches Association.

In 1964, he led the Indiana team to its sixth straight USA national championships (AAU at the time).

In 1979, at the age of 58, he briefly became the oldest person to swim the English Channel.

Swimmers who swam for Counsilman include: Jim Montgomery, Gary Hall, John Kinsella, Mike Troy, Charlie Hickcox, Larry Barbiere, Don McKenzie, Chet Jastremski, Wally Ris, Bowen Stassforth, Tom Stock, George Breen, Mike Stamm, Alan Somers, Ted Stickles, John Murphy, Bill Heiss, Fred Tyler,  John Waldman, Tom Hickcox, and Mark Spitz.

Post IU
Doc Counsilman is known as one of the greatest swimming coaches of all time. He was also an innovator in the sport, pioneering underwater filming, and even watching swimmers underwater, as can be seen in Royer Pool at Indiana University today. He was also the instigator of hypoventilation training, a training method which consists of swimming with reduced breathing frequency.

Counsilman died in Bloomington, Indiana, in 2004, after suffering from Parkinson's disease.

He has been inducted into various Hall of Fames, including: the International Swimming Hall of Fame (1976), Ohio State Varsity "O" Hall of Fame (1988), IU Athletics (2001), the American Swimming Coaches Association and SUNY Cortland (2005).

See also
 List of members of the International Swimming Hall of Fame
 List of Ohio State University people

References

Bibliography
 The Science of Swimming, by James E. Counsilman, Prentice Hall, Juni 1968, 
 The Complete Book of Swimming , by James E. Counsilman, Atheneum, 1977, 
 Competitive Swimming Manual for Coaches and Swimmers, by James E. Counsilman, Counsilman Co., 1977, 
 The New Science of Swimming, by James E. Counsilman and Brian E. Counsilman, Prentice Hall, April 1994,

External links
 Counsilman Center for the Science of Swimming – Official website
 

2004 deaths
American swimming coaches
College swimming coaches in the United States
Neurological disease deaths in Indiana
Deaths from Parkinson's disease
Indiana Hoosiers swimming coaches
Ohio State Buckeyes men's swimmers
Sportspeople from Birmingham, Alabama
United States Army Air Forces bomber pilots of World War II
American expatriates in Italy